József Keresztessy may refer to:

 József Keresztessy (gymnast) (1885–1962), Hungarian gymnast
 József Keresztessy (fencer) (1819–1895), master of fencing, founder of the sword fencing in Hungary